Velemyšleves is a municipality and village in Louny District in the Ústí nad Labem Region of the Czech Republic. It has about 400 inhabitants.

Administrative parts
Villages of Minice, Truzenice and Zálezly, and the area of the industrial zone called Velemyšleves-Průmyslová zóna Triangle are administrative parts of Velemyšleves.

References

Villages in Louny District